Rottier is a surname. Notable people with the surname include:

Simeon Rottier (born 1984), Canadian football player
Stephanie Rottier (born 1974), Dutch tennis player

See also
Rottiers